Maryam Sedarati (born 1 June 1950) is a retired Iranian athlete. In 1973 she became the first Iranian woman to win a medal at an international athletics competition, a bronze in the high jump at the Asian Championships. Next year she placed fifth in the pentathlon at the 1974 Asian Games. Sedarati held the national high jump record from 1964 to 1996. She semi-retired from athletics between 1968 and 1973, to marry and raise her child, and then set her last national record in 1973.

References

Iranian female high jumpers
1950 births
Living people
Athletes (track and field) at the 1974 Asian Games
Asian Games competitors for Iran